Mylius-Erichsen Land is a peninsula in King Frederick VIII Land, northeastern Greenland. Administratively it belongs to the NE Greenland National Park area.

Geography
Mylius-Erichsen Land is bounded in the north by the Independence Fjord, in the west by the Hagen Fjord and the Hagen Glacier, in the east by the Danmark Fjord and in the south by the Greenland Ice Sheet. There is no large calving glacier at the head of the Danmark Fjord, but all surrounding fjords are icebound the whole year round.

The northernmost headland is Cape Rigsdagen and the northern section of the peninsula appears in some maps as "Valdemar Glückstadt Land."

History
Mylius-Erichsen Land was named by the 1906-1908 Denmark expedition after its ill-fated leader Ludvig Mylius-Erichsen.

References

Peninsulas of Greenland